The Ranchi–Varanasi Express is an express train belonging to South Eastern Railway zone that runs between Ranchi Junction and Varanasi Junction in India. It is currently being operated with 18611/18612 train numbers on four days in a week basis.

Service

The 18611/Ranchi–Varanasi Express has  an average speed of 45 km/hr and covers 577 km in 12h 45m. 18612/Varanasi–Ranchi Express has an average speed of 43 km/hr and covers 577 km in 13h 25m.

Route and halts 

The important halts of the train are:

 
 
 
 
 
 
 
 
 
 
 
 
 Pt. Deen Dayal Upadhyaya Junction

Coach composite

The train has standard LCF rakes with max speed of 110 kmph. The train consists of 11 coaches:

 4 Sleeper coaches
 5 General
 2 Generators cum Luggage/parcel van

Traction

Both trains are hauled by a Santragachi Loco Shed-based WAP-4 electric locomotive from Ranchi to Varanasi and vice versa.

See also 

 Varanasi Junction railway station
 Ranchi Junction railway station
 Ranchi–Mumbai LTT Express
 Sambalpur–Varanasi Express

Notes

External links 

 18611/Ranchi–Varanasi Express
 18612/Varanasi–Ranchi Express

References 

Passenger trains originating from Varanasi
Transport in Ranchi
Express trains in India
Rail transport in Jharkhand
Rail transport in Bihar